Philosophers born in the 18th century (and others important in the history of philosophy), listed alphabetically:

Note: This list has a minimal criterion for inclusion and the relevance to philosophy of some individuals on the list is disputed.

A 
 Jacob Friedrich von Abel, (1751–1829)
 John Abercrombie, (1780–1844)
 Johann Heinrich Abicht, (1762–1816)
 John Adams, (1735–1826)
 Francesco Algarotti, (1712–1764)
 Archibald Alison, (1757–1839)
 John Allen, (1771–1843)
 Anton Wilhelm Amo, (1703 – c. 1759)
 Robert Aspland, (1782–1845)
 Georg Anton Friedrich Ast, (1778–1841)
 John Austin, (1790–1859)
 Pierre Hyacinthe Azais, (1766–1845)

B 
 Franz Xaver von Baader, (1765–1841)
 Charles Babbage, (1791–1871)
 Samuel Bailey, (1791–1870)
 Pierre-Simon Ballanche, (1776–1847)
 John Ballantyne, (1778–1830)
 Christoph Gottfried Bardili, (1761–1808)
 Alexander Gottlieb Baumgarten, (1714–1762)
 James Beattie, (1735–1803)
 Cesare, Marquis of Beccaria, (1738–1794)
 Jacob Sigismund Beck, (1761–1840)
 Charles Bell, (1774–1842)
 Thomas Belsham, (1750–1829)
 William Belsham, (1752–1829)
 Friedrich Eduard Beneke, (1798–1854)
 Jeremy Bentham, (1748–1832)
 William Blackstone, (1723–1780)
 Hugh Blair, (1718–1800)
 William Blake, (1757–1827)
 Robert Blakey, (1795–1878)
 Bernard Bolzano, (1781–1848)*
 Louis Gabriel Ambroise de Bonald, (1754–1840)
 Charles Bonnet, (1720–1793)
 Rudjer Boscovich, (1711–1787)
 David Brewster, (1781–1868)
 Jean Anthelme Brillat-Savarin, (1755–1826)
 Benjamin Collins Brodie, (1783–1862)
 Henry Brougham, (1778–1868)
 Thomas Brown, (1778–1820)
 Robert Buchanan, (1786–1873)
 Georges-Louis Leclerc, Comte de Buffon, (1707–1788)
 William Burdon, (1764–1818)
 Edmund Burke, (1729–1797)
 Lawrence Butterworth, (1740–1828)

C 
 Pierre Jean George Cabanis, (1757–1808)
 George Campbell, (1719–1796)
 Thomas Carlyle, (1795–1881)
 Petr Iakovlevich Chaadev, (1794–1856)
 Heinrich Moritz Chalybäus, (1796–1862)
 Chang Hsueh-ch'eng (or Zhang Xuecheng), (1738–1801)
 Tasan Chông Yagyong, (1762–1836)
 Samuel Taylor Coleridge, (1772–1834)
 Auguste Comte, (1798–1857)
 Étienne Bonnot de Condillac, (1715–1780)
 Marquis de Condorcet, (1743–1794)
 Benjamin Constant, (1767–1830)
 Victor Cousin, (1792–1867)
 Johann Ulrich von Cramer, (1706–1772)
 Christian August Crusius, (1715–1775)

D 
 Jean le Rond d'Alembert, (1717–1783)
 Joseph de Maistre, (1753–1821)
 Emerich de Vattel, (1714–1767)
 Denis Diderot, (1713–1784)
 Émilie du Châtelet, (1706–1749)

E 
 Johann Augustus Eberhard, (1739–1809)
 Jonathan Edwards, (1703–1758)

F 
 Adam Ferguson, (1723–1816)
 Johann Gottlieb Fichte, (1762–1814)
 Immanuel Hermann Fichte, (1797–1879)
 David Fordyce, (1711–1751)
 Charles Fourier, (1772–1837)
 Benjamin Franklin, (1706–1790)
 Jakob Friedrich Fries, (1773–1843)

G 
 Alexander Gerard, (1728–1795)
 Giacinto Sigismondo Gerdil, (1718–1802)
 Thomas Gisbourne, (1758–1846)
 William Godwin, (1756–1836)
 Johann Wolfgang von Goethe, (1749–1832)
 George Grote, (1794–1871)

H 
 Johann Georg Hamann, (1730–1788)
 Sir William Hamilton, (1788–1856)
 Renn Dickson Hampden, (1793–1868)
 David Hartley, (1705–1757)
 Julius Charles Hare, (1795–1855)
 Graves Chamney Haughton, (1788–1849)
 Laetitia Matilda Hawkins, (1759–1851)
 David Ramsay Hay, (1798–1866)
 Mary Hays, (1760–1843)
 Francis Haywood, (1798–1858)
 William Hazlitt, (1778–1830)
 G.W.F. Hegel, (1770–1831)
 Claude Adrien Helvétius, (1715–1771)
 Johann Friedrich Herbart, (1776–1841)
 Johann Gottfried Herder, (1744–1803)
 John Herschel, (1792–1871)
 Samuel Heywood, (1753–1828)
 Laurens Perseus Hickok, (1798–1888)
 Hermann Friedrich Wilhelm Hinrichs, (1794–1861)
 Thomas Hodgskin, (1787–1869)
 Josef Hoëné-Wronski, (1778–1853)
 Baron d'Holbach, (1723–1789)
 Friedrich Hölderlin, (1770–1843)
 John Hoppus, (1789–1875)
 Wilhelm von Humboldt, (1767–1835)*
 David Hume, (1711–1776)

I

J 
 Friedrich Heinrich Jacobi, (1743–1819)
 Thomas Jefferson, (1743–1826)
 Alexander Bryan Johnson, (1786–1867)
 Dr. Samuel Johnson, (1709–1784)
 Théodore Simon Jouffroy, (1796–1842)

K 
 Theophilos Kairis (1784–1853)
 Immanuel Kant, (1724–1804)*
 Heinrich von Kleist, (1777–1811)
 Richard Payne Knight, (1750–1824)
 Martin Knutzen, (1713–1751)
 Hugo Kołłątaj, (1750–1812)
 Karl Christian Friedrich Krause, (1781–1832)
 Nachman Krochmal, (1785–1840)
 Wilhelm Traugott Krug, (1770–1842)

L 
 Julien Offray de La Mettrie, (1709–1751)
 Jean-Baptiste Lamarck, (1744–1829)
 Johann Heinrich Lambert, (1728–1777)
 Lamennais, (1752–1854)
 Pierre-Simon Laplace, (1749–1827)
 Pierre Laromiguière, (1756–1837)
 Giacomo Leopardi, (1798–1837)
 Pierre Leroux, (1798–1871)
 Gotthold Ephraim Lessing, (1729–1781)
 Georg Christoph Lichtenberg, (1742–1799)
 Carl Linnaeus, (1707–1778)

M 
 Gabriel Bonnot de Mably, (1709–1785)
 Salomon Maimon (or Salomon ben Joshua), (1753–1800)
 Maine de Biran, (1766–1824)
 Moses Mendelssohn, (1729–1786)
 James Mill, (1773–1836)
 John Millar, (1735–1801)
 Lord Monboddo (or James Burnett), (1714–1799)
 Motoori Norinaga, (1730–1801)

N 
 Novalis, (1772–1801)

O 
 Lorenz Oken, (1779–1851)
 James Oswald, (1703–1793)

P 
 Thomas Paine, (1737–1809)
 William Paley, (1743–1805)
 Thomas Percival, (1740–1804)
 Issac de Pinto, (1715–1787)
 Richard Price, (1723–1791)
 Joseph Priestley, (1733–1804)

Q

R 
 Daniel Raymond, (1786–1849)
 August Wilhelm Rehberg, (fl. late 18th century)*
 Thomas Reid, (1710–1796)
 Karl Leonhard Reinhold, (1757–1823)
 David Ricardo, (1772–1823)
 Antonio Rosmini-Serbati, (1797–1855)
 Jean Jacques Rousseau, (1712–1778)
 Claude Henri de Rouvroy, Comte de Saint-Simon, (1760–1825)
 Pierre Paul Royer-Collard, (1763–1845)

S 
 Mulla Hadi Sabzevari, (1797–1873)
 Marquis de Sade, (1740–1814)
 Claude Henri de Rouvroy, Comte de Saint-Simon, (1760–1825)
 Friedrich Carl von Savigny, (1779–1861)
 Friedrich Schelling, (1775–1852)
 Friedrich Schiller, (1759–1805)
 Friedrich von Schlegel, (1772–1829)*
 Friedrich Schleiermacher, (1768–1834)
 Arthur Schopenhauer, (1788–1860)
 Gottlob Ernst Schulze, (1761–1833)
 Shah Wali Allah (or Qutb al-Din Ahmad al-Rahim or Waliullah), (1703–1762)
 Lady Mary Shepherd, (1777–1847)
 Heinrich Christoph Wilhelm Sigwart, (1789–1844)
 Hryhori Skovoroda, (1722–1794)
 Adam Smith, (1723–1790)
 Jan Sniadecki, (1756–1830)
 Karl Wilhelm Ferdinand Solger, (1780–1890)
 Anne Louise Germaine de Staël, (1766–1817)
 Stanisław Staszic, (1755–1826)
 Dugald Stewart, (1753–1828)

T 
 Tai Chen (or Dai Zhen or Tai Tung-Yuan), (1724–1777)
 Johannes Nikolaus Tetens, (1736–1807)
 William Thompson, (1775–1833)
 Tominaga Nakamoto, (1715–1746)
 Abraham Tucker, (1705–1774)

U

V 
 Emerich de Vattel, (1714–1767)
 Vauvenargues, (1715–1747)

W 
 William Whewell, (1794–1866)
 John Witherspoon, (1723–1794)
 Mary Wollstonecraft, (1759–1797)

X

Y 
 Yü Cheng-hsieh, (1775–1840)

Z

See also 
 List of philosophers
 18th-century philosophy
 List of philosophers born in the centuries BC
 List of philosophers born in the 1st through 10th centuries
 List of philosophers born in the 11th through 14th centuries
 List of philosophers born in the 15th and 16th centuries''
 List of philosophers born in the 17th century
 List of philosophers born in the 19th century
 List of philosophers born in the 20th century

Notes 

18
Lists of 18th-century people